Costa Rica Green Airways Ltda. is a domestic airline based in San José, Costa Rica.

History 
The airline was established in 2018 by Everardo Carmona, co-founder of CarmonAir Charter. It started operations in November 2018.

Destinations 
The destinations of Costa Rica Green Airways are:
Quepos
San José
Tambor
Bocas del Toro

Fleet 
As of June 2022, the Costa Rica Green Airways fleet consists of:

References

External links 
Official website

Airlines of Costa Rica
Airlines established in 2018